Marian Lois Robinson (née Shields; born July 29, 1937) is the mother of Michelle Obama, former First Lady of the United States, and Craig Robinson, a basketball executive. She is also the mother-in-law of 44th U.S. President Barack Obama.

Ancestry and early life 
Marian Shields was born in Chicago in 1937, the fourth of seven children—five girls, followed by two boys—born to Purnell Nathaniel Shields, a house painter and carpenter, and his wife Rebecca Jumper, a licensed practical nurse. Both parents had multi-racial ancestry. Her mother's grandfather, Dolphus T. Shields (c. 1860–1950), was a direct descendant of slavery, with his mother enslaved and his white father the heir of the slaver; he had moved from rural Georgia to Birmingham, Alabama, where he established his own carpentry and tool sharpening business. His descendants would eventually move to Chicago during the Great Migration.

Personal life 
Shields married Fraser Robinson III on October 27, 1960, in Chicago. They had two children together, Craig Malcolm and Michelle LaVaughn, named after Fraser's mother. She worked as a secretary for mail-order retailer Spiegel, the University of Chicago, and a bank. In the late 60's, Shields lived with her family in a rented second floor apartment of a brick bungalow the South Side of Chicago that belonged to her aunt Robbie and her husband Terry. This is where she raised her two children, Michelle and Craig, and continued to live until she eventually moved to the White House with the Obamas. Michelle Obama, in her book Becoming, describes her mother's strong attachment to her Chicago home and her commitment to raising her children as a stay at home mother. Shields resumed work as an executive assistant at a bank when her daughter Michelle started high school.

Relationship with Michelle Obama 
Michelle describes her mother as forthright and honest, and speaks of her implacability and her silent support as a child and beyond. Shields used to take her daughter Michelle to the library long before she started school and used to sit beside her as she learned to read and write. Usually the kind of mother who expected her children to settle their own disputes, Shields was quick to see real distress and stepped in to help when needed. For example, when Michelle was in second grade and was distressed because of being devalued by a teacher, Shields advocated for her and was instrumental in getting her daughter better learning opportunities at school. Shields encouraged her children to communicate with her about all subjects by being available when needed and giving practical advice. She entertained Michelle's school friends when they visited and enabled her to make her own choices in important matters.

Obama campaign and life in the White House 
While Michelle and Barack Obama campaigned for his candidacy as president in 2008, Robinson helped them by providing support to her granddaughters, Malia and Sasha Obama. During Barack Obama's presidency, Robinson was living at the White House with the First Family.

References

Further reading
Swarns, Rachel L. (2012). American Tapestry: The Story of the Black, White, and Multiracial Ancestors of Michelle Obama HarperCollins. .

External links
 "Marian Robinson", The New York Times
 "A Mother's Love: First Lady & Mom", Essence magazine
 "An In-Law Is Finding Washington to Her Liking ", The New York Times

1937 births
Living people
People from Chicago
African-American people
Obama family
Michelle Obama